
Gmina Twardogóra is an urban-rural gmina (administrative district) in Oleśnica County, Lower Silesian Voivodeship, in south-western Poland.

It is part of the larger Wrocław metropolitan area.

Neighbouring gminas
Gmina Twardogóra is bordered by the gminas of Dobroszyce, Krośnice, Międzybórz, Oleśnica, Sośnie and Syców.

Villages
Apart from the town of Twardogóra, the gmina contains the villages of Będzin, Brodowce, Brzezina, Bukowinka, Chełstów, Chełstówek, Cztery Chałupy, Czwórka, Dąbrowa, Domasławice, Drągów, Drągówek, Drogoszowice, Droździęcin, Gola Mała, Gola Wielka, Goszcz, Grabek, Grabowno Małe, Grabowno Wielkie, Jezioro, Kolonia, Kuźnia Goszczańska, Kuźnica Goszczańska, Łazisko, Lorki-Kolonia, Moszyce, Nowa Wieś Goszczańska, Olszówka, Pajęczak, Poręby, Pustkowie, Sądrożyce, Sosnówka, Świniary, Szczodrak, Troska, Trzy Chałupy, Wesółka and Zakrzów.

References

Twardogora
Oleśnica County